Shuddha Saveri or śuddha sāveri  is a ragam in Carnatic music (musical scale of South Indian classical music) and Yakshagana music. It is an audava rāgam (or owdava rāgam, meaning pentatonic scale). It is a janya rāgam (derived scale)of the Melakarta ragam Dhīraśaṅkarābharaṇaṃ which is 29th Melakarta raga. In Hindustani music it is called Durga. According to the school of Muthuswami Dikshitar, this rāgam is called Devakriya. Karnataka Shuddha Saveri, a janya rāgam of 1st melakarta Kanakangi, is called Shuddha Saveri by the Dikshitar school.

Structure and Lakshana 

Shuddha Saveri is a symmetric rāgam that does not contain gāndhāram or nishādam. It is a pentatonic scale (audava-audava ragam in Carnatic music classification – audava meaning 'of 5'). Its  structure (ascending and descending scale) is as follows (see swaras in Carnatic music for details on below notation and terms):
  : 
  : 

It is a scale that uses the following variants of the swaras – chatushruti rishabham, shuddha madhyamam, panchamam and chatushruti dhaivatam.

Shuddha Saveri is considered a janya rāgam of Sankarabharanam, the 29th melakarta rāgam, though it can be derived from other melakarta rāgams, Kharaharapriya, Gourimanohari or Harikambhoji, by dropping both gāndhāram and nishādam.

Popular compositions 
Here are some popular kritis composed in Shuddha Saveri.
 Darinē telusukonṭi and Kālaharaṇamēla rā harē by Tyagaraja in Telugu
 Sri Guruguha Tarayashumaam by Deekshitar
 Samajavarada Niku by Poochi Srinivasa Iyengar
 Taye tripura sundari by Periyasaamy Thooran
 Janani pahi sada (Navarathri 7th Day krithi) by Swathi Thirunal
Ānalekara, by Purandara Dasa which is set to this rāgam, is one of the first few geetams (very short compositions) taught to beginners.
 Dharma Shravana By Purandara Dasa
 Ee Muddu Krishnana By Vadiraja Tirtha
 Shri guruguha tarayashu mam by Muthuswami Dikshitar
 sarvajīva dayākarī by Oothukkadu Venkata Kavi is also popular
 kamala-vilochani by Hari Sundareswara sharma
 shankara gangadhara shrikantha and shrimat simhasaneshvari by Muthiah Bhagavatar
 Veedhula Veedhula by Annamacharya
 Ada Pogona, Elladi Bande  By Sripadaraja
 Hyange Madalayya  By Gopala Dasa
Sadhasiva kumara by pabanasamsivan

Film Songs

Language:Tamil

Related rāgams 
This section covers the theoretical and scientific aspect of this rāgam.

Graha bhedam 
Shuddha Saveri's notes when shifted using Graha bhedam, yields 4 other major pentatonic rāgams, namely, Mohanam, Hindolam, Madhyamavati and Udayaravichandrika (also known as Shuddha Dhanyasi). Graha bhedam is the step taken in keeping the relative note frequencies same, while shifting the shadjam to the next note in the rāgam. See Graha bhedam on Mohanam for more details and illustration of this concept.

Scale similarities 
 Ārabhi is a rāgam which has the ascending scale of Shuddha Saveri and descending scale of Sankarabharanam. Its  structure is S R2 M1 P D2 S : S N3 D2 P M1 G3 R2 S
 Janaranjani is a rāgam which has the ascending scale of Shankarabharanam and descending scale of Shuddha Saveri. Its  structure is S R2 G3 M1 P D2 N3 P S : S D2 P M1 R2 S
 Karnataka Shuddha Saveri of Dikshitar school has Shuddha Rishabham in place of Chatushruti Rishabham and Shuddha Dhaivatam in place of Chatushruti Dhaivatam.  Its  structure is S R1 M1 P D1 S : S D1 P M1 R1 S.

Notes

References 

Janya ragas